This article is a list of notable people who were born in and/or have lived in Lawrence, Kansas.  Alumni of University of Kansas or Haskell Indian Nations University, including athletes and coaches, that are not originally from Lawrence should not be included in this list, instead, they should be listed in List of University of Kansas people.  This includes faculty and coaches who stayed in Lawrence after retirement.

Persons not born in Lawrence are marked with §.

A
The Appleseed Cast, band
Karole Armitage, choreographer §

B
Martha Bablitch, judge
Leo Beuerman, pencil salesman, subject of a 1969 short film nominated for an Academy Award
Amani Bledsoe, professional football player 
David Booth, entrepreneur
Corinne Brinkerhoff, television producer and writer
Erin Brockovich, environmental activist
George Brown, politician
William Burroughs, author §
Sarah Buxton, singer

C
Dorothy Canfield Fisher, author
Danny Carey, musician, drummer for Tool
Judge Louis Carpenter, judge and lawyer, murdered in Lawrence Massacre on August 21, 1863 §
Cattle Annie, bandit born in Lawrence in 1882
Paul Coker Jr., illustrator, Mad Magazine and Rankin-Bass

D
Karen Dalton, musician §
George Docking, politician §
Robert Docking, politician §

E
Bart D. Ehrman, scholar, author
Loren Eiseley, anthropologist, author §
Michael S. Engel, scholar, paleontologist, entomologist §
Ronald Evans, NASA astronaut (Pathfinder to the Stars) §

F
 Mike Finnigan, musician §
 Marci Francisco, politician §
 Thomas Frank, author §

G
Robert L. Gernon, jurist §
The Get Up Kids, rock band
Edward C. Gleed, U.S. Army Air Force officer with the famed Buffalo Soldiers/9th Cavalry Regiment (United States) and Tuskegee Airmen

H
John Hadl, NCAA and NFL football quarterback, College Football Hall of Fame
William A. Harris, U.S. Senator
Herk Harvey, actor, director, producer, writer §
John G. Haskell, architect of numerous Lawrence buildings as well as the Kansas State Capitol §
Bobby Henrich, MLB player
Stan Herd, crop artist §
Ralph Houk, MLB pitcher and manager
Henry Salem Hubbell, American Impressionist painter
Isaac F. Hughes, City Council member in Lawrence and in Los Angeles, California §
Langston Hughes, poet and author §
Kelley Hunt, blues singer, pianist, songwriter

J
Bill James, baseball statistician and author §
Steve Jeltz, professional baseball player §
Patty Jenkins, film writer and director §

K
Tom Keegan, sportswriter §
Maggie Koerth-Baker, science journalist and blogger §

L
Jon Lemmon, footballer

M
Deane Waldo Malott, university president §
Danny Manning, professional basketball player §
Mates of State, rock band
Mark Maxey, filmmaker §
David McClain, university president
Elmer McCollum, scientist
Patricia A. McCoy, Inaugural Liberty Mutual Insurance Professor of Law at Boston College and first Assistant Director for Mortgage Markets, at the Consumer Financial Protection Bureau
Minus Story, band §
Na Mira, artist §
Bryce Montes de Oca, Baseball player for the New York Mets
Jason Moss, musician
Alan Mulally, business executive, CEO of Ford Motor Corporation §

N
 Bill Nieder, track and field athlete (shot put), won silver medal at 1956 Summer Olympics and gold in 1960 Summer Olympics, set three shot put world records

O
Marcus Oliveria, boxer §

P
Sara Paretsky, novelist §
Paw, rock band
Ryan Pope, musician (The Get Up Kids)
Matthew Pryor, musician (The Get Up Kids)

R
 Charles L. Robinson, first governor of Kansas §
 Sara Tappan Doolittle Robinson, writer, historian, First Lady of Kansas §

S
Kliph Scurlock, drummer of The Flaming Lips §
Stanley Sheldon, bass player for Peter Frampton §
Stephen Six, Attorney General of Kansas'
Split Lip Rayfield, band §
Sri Srinivasan, U.S. Federal Judge §
William A. Starrett, builder and architect of skyscrapers, notably the Empire State Building.
Robby Steinhardt, violinist, vocalist with band Kansas

T
Solon O. Thacher, judge and politician §

W
John Allen Wakefield, political and military leader §
George Walker, African-American vaudeville actor
Donald Worster, environmental historian, author
Henry Wright, planner and architect

Y
Jeff Yagher, actor

See also

 List of lists of people from Kansas
 List of University of Kansas people
 List of Haskell Indian Nations Fighting Indians head football coaches
 List of Kansas Jayhawks head football coaches

References

Further reading

Lawrence, Kansas
Lawrence